Daniel Romańczyk (born 28 April 1985) is a Polish sport shooter.

He participated at the 2018 ISSF World Shooting Championships, winning a medal.

References

External links

Living people
1985 births
Polish male sport shooters
ISSF rifle shooters
21st-century Polish people